Hepatic stellate cells (HSC), also known as perisinusoidal cells or Ito cells (earlier lipocytes or fat-storing cells), are pericytes found in the perisinusoidal space of the liver, also known as the space of Disse (a small area between the sinusoids and hepatocytes). The stellate cell is the major cell type involved in liver fibrosis, which is the formation of scar tissue in response to liver damage.

Structure
Hepatic stellate cells can be selectively stained with gold chloride, but their distinguishing feature in routine histological preparations is the presence of multiple lipid droplets in their cytoplasm. Cytoglobin expression has been shown to be a specific marker with which hepatic stellate cells can be distinguished from portal myofibroblasts in the damaged human liver. In murine (rats, mice) liver, reelin expressed by Ito cells has been shown to be a reliable marker in discerning them from other myofibroblasts. The expression of reelin is increased after liver injury.

Function
In normal liver, stellate cells are described as being in a quiescent state. Quiescent stellate cells represent 5-8% of the total number of liver cells. Each cell has several long protrusions that extend from the cell body and wrap around the sinusoids. The lipid droplets in the cell body store vitamin A as retinol ester. The function and role of quiescent hepatic stellate cells is unclear. Recent evidence suggests a role as a liver-resident antigen-presenting cell, presenting lipid antigens to and stimulating proliferation of NKT cells.

When the liver is damaged, stellate cells can change into an activated state. The activated stellate cell is characterized by proliferation, contractility, and chemotaxis. This state of the stellate cell is the main source of extracellular matrix production in liver injury. This attribute makes it a key factor in the pathophysiology of the liver. The amount of stored vitamin A decreases progressively in liver injury. The activated stellate cell is also responsible for secreting collagen scar tissue, which can lead to cirrhosis. More recent studies have also shown that in vivo activation of hepatic stellate cells by agents causing liver fibrosis can eventually lead to senescence in these cells, marked by increased SA-beta-galactosidase staining, as well as p53 accumulation and activation of Rb–hallmarks of cellular senescence. Senescent hepatic stellate cells have been demonstrated to limit liver fibrosis by activating interactions with NK cells. Senescence of hepatic stellate cells could prevent progression of liver fibrosis, although this has not been implemented as a therapy, and would carry the risk of hepatic dysfunction.

History
The cells of Ito were named for Toshio Ito, a twentieth-century Japanese physician, who introduced a fat-staining method to identify the "fat-storing cells" of the liver.

See also 

 Pancreatic stellate cell
 Stellate cell
List of human cell types derived from the germ layers

References

External links
 
 Liver Research at AU-KBC Stellate cell biology

Liver anatomy
Human cells